ITEC is an acronym or abbreviation with several meanings:

 Indian Technical and Economic Cooperation Programme, India's foreign aid development program
 Induced thymic epithelial cell, a type of stem cell
 International Therapy Examination Council, an international examination board offering a variety of qualifications worldwide
 International Turbine Engine Corporation, a joint venture company between Honeywell and Aerospace Industrial Development Corporation
 Inter-Tribal Environmental Council, a consortium of over 40 Native American tribes in Oklahoma, New Mexico and Texas
 Into the Electric Castle, an album by progressive metal musical project Ayreon
 ITEC Kasaragod, the Information Technology Education Centre, affiliated with Kannur University, Kannur, India
 Indigenous People's Technology and Education Center, a not-for-profit organization in Dunnellon, Florida
 International Tuba Euphonium Conference